Toi is a fairly common man's name in Māori and other Polynesian languages.

The best known men named Toi are the following from Māori legendary history, who are sometimes confused with one another:

Toi-te-huatahi, about whom there are various traditions. In Te Arawa tradition, a chief who never left Hawaiki. In the Ngati Awa tradition, a descendant of the fantail, the original settler of New Zealand. In the discredited 'orthodox' or "Great Fleet" story, a man from Hawaiki who settled at Whakatane after following his grandson Whatonga. 
Toi-te-huatahi II, in the discredited Great Fleet story,  a man who settled at Whakatāne after following his grandson Whatonga, much later than Toi-te-huatahi I.
Toi-kai-rākau, an ancestor of the Tūhoe tribe. In some traditions, this is an alternative name for Toi-te-huatahi.

The descendants of Toi-kai-rākau are named Te Tini-a-Toi – the many descendants of Toi. In the part of the Bay of Plenty where the Mātaatua canoe landed, these descendants were divided into at least 18 groups or hapu. Sometimes also the name Te Tini o Toi is used.

See also

Tó, nicknames
Ton (given name)
Kupe
Māori migration canoes

Footnotes

Literature
 Halbert, R. (1999) Horouta, Reed Books, Auckland. 
 Simmonds, D.R. (1976)The Great New Zealand Myth, Reed Books.

Legendary Māori people